La cuisine en dix minutes, ou l'Adaptation au rhythme moderne (English title: French Cooking in Ten Minutes, or, Adapting to the Rhythm of Modern Life, also Cooking in Ten Minutes, or, Adapting to the Rhythm of Modern Life) by Édouard de Pomiane, published in 1930, was an early and influential title on the subject of convenience cooking. It attempted to render many of the basic techniques of classic French cooking into a quick form for people who did not have time to cook.

Compared to modern convenience cookbooks, almost everything is from scratch, though a good number of recipes call for canned vegetables (a modern cook might use frozen vegetables instead) as well as commercially available charcuterie products such as sausages and pâté. De Pomiane also adopts a rather tongue-in-cheek approach to writing and admonishes the reader to limit complexity and plan carefully.

The book has been translated into several languages. The first German translation appeared in 1935, the first English translation in 1948. The book is still popular, particularly in the English speaking part of the world. The latest English edition appeared in 2008, in 2010 the British Newspaper The Observer put it on rank 41 on its list of the 50 best cookbooks of all time.

References

Edouard de Pomiane: French Cooking in Ten Minutes or, Adapting to the rhythm of modern life. Translation: Philip and Mary Hyman. Farrar, Straus and Giroux, New York 1977  
Édouard de Pomiane in WorldCat
Cooking in Ten Minutes. 50 best cookbooks of all time in Observer Food Monthly. The Guardian, 10. August 2010

1930 books
French cookbooks